Anthony King (born 19 July 1943) is a Barbadian cricketer. He played in nine first-class matches for the Barbados cricket team from 1960 to 1971.

See also
 List of Barbadian representative cricketers

References

External links
 

1943 births
Living people
Barbadian cricketers
Barbados cricketers
People from Saint Michael, Barbados